Parliamentary elections were held in Bulgaria on 19 October 1903. The result was a victory for the People's Party, which won 134 of the 169 seats. Voter turnout was 41.2%.

Results

References

Bulgaria
1903 in Bulgaria
October 1903 events
Parliamentary elections in Bulgaria
1903 elections in Bulgaria